Stanley and Outwood East is a former ward in the metropolitan borough of the City of Wakefield, West Yorkshire, England.  The former ward contains twelve listed buildings that are recorded in the National Heritage List for England.  Of these, one is listed at Grade II*, the middle of the three grades, and the others are at Grade II, the lowest grade.  Most of the listed buildings are houses, cottages and associated structures.  There are two listed buildings constructed by the Aire and Calder Navigation Company, and the other listed building is a milepost.


Key

Buildings

References

Citations

Sources

 

Lists of listed buildings in West Yorkshire